Aimsun is a software company that provides simulation software and services for transportation planning and traffic management.

Overview 
Aimsun was founded in 1997 and developed Aimsun Next traffic modeling software, which simulates mobility in networks.

Aimsun also develops Aimsun Live, which is a simulation-based traffic forecasting software as well as Aimsun Auto for studying path planning in driverless vehicles, and Aimsun Ride for modeling demand-responsive transportation services.

Aimsun was acquired by Siemens in 2018 for an undisclosed sum, as part of the Siemens Mobility Intelligent Traffic Systems (ITS) unit.

In 2021, Siemens Mobility carved out the Intelligent Traffic Systems (ITS) unit, of which Aimsun is a part, and renamed it Yunex Traffic.

Transport models 

 Paris (Aimsun Paris match)
 London (Transport for London, Aimsun Next platform)
 Sydney
 New York City
 Abu Dhabi (Aimsun Abu Dhabi transport model)
 Singapore (Aimsun Live Technology Trial in Singapore)
 Bergen (Aimsun smart traffic management pilot in Norway)
 Western Australia (Transport predictive solution)

Recognition 

 Highways Industry category award for Aimsun’s air quality modelling solution at the Highways Awards.
 Smart Transport Infrastructure Award (M4 Smart Motorway Project – Simulation-Based Support for Smart Motorway Infrastructure)
 Won Excellence in Research and Development Award by ITS for Sydney Victoria Road Intelligent Decision Support System

References 

Simulation software
Traffic management